is a Japanese internet company originally formed as a joint venture between American internet company Yahoo! (later merged with Verizon) and the Japanese company SoftBank. It is headquartered at Kioi Tower in the Tokyo Garden Terrace Kioicho complex in Kioicho, Chiyoda, Tokyo. Yahoo! Japan's web portal is the most visited website in Japan, and its internet services are mostly dominant in the country. According to The Japan Times, as of 2012, Yahoo Japan had a footprint on the internet market in Japan. In terms of use as a search engine, however, it has never surpassed Google. The company is the second largest search engine used in Japan as of July 2021, with a market share of 19% behind Google's 77%.

In March 2021, the company merged with Line Corporation, placing both companies under parent Z Holdings.

History
Yahoo! and SoftBank formed Yahoo! Japan in January 1996 to establish the first web portal in Japan. Yahoo! Japan went live on April 1, 1996. Yahoo! Japan was listed on JASDAQ in November 1997. In January 2000, it became the first stock in Japanese history to trade for more than ¥100 million per share. The company was listed on the Tokyo Stock Exchange in October 2003 and became part of the Nikkei 225 stock market index in 2005.

Yahoo! Japan acquired the naming rights for the Fukuoka Dome in 2005, renaming the dome as the "Fukuoka Yahoo! Japan Dome". The "Yahoo Dome" is the home field for the Fukuoka SoftBank Hawks, a professional baseball team majority owned by SoftBank.

Since 2010, Yahoo! Japan's search engine has been based on Google's search technology. In exchange, Google receives user activity data from Yahoo! Japan's various products.

In 2017, Verizon Communications purchased the core internet business of United States-based Yahoo!, and merged it with AOL into Oath, Inc.; Yahoo! Japan was not affected. It continued as a joint venture between Softbank and what remained of Yahoo! Inc. was renamed Altaba. Yahoo! had been declining economically and in popularity since the late 2000s, but this was not the case for Yahoo! Japan, which continued to dominate Japan's internet industry.  Following the sale, Yahoo! Japan continued to use the name "Yahoo!" under license from Verizon Communications. In July 2018, SoftBank bought $2 billion worth of shares in Yahoo! Japan from Altaba, increasing its stake to 48.17 percent. Yahoo! Japan, in turn, bought nearly the same amount of stock from SoftBank. In September 2018, Altaba sold all of its remaining shares in Yahoo! Japan for roughly $4.3 billion. Yahoo! Japan acquired trademark rights to the "Yahoo!" brand in Japan from Verizon in 2021.

In March 2021 Line Corporation merged with Yahoo! Japan, which has been operated by Z Holdings, a SoftBank Group subsidiary. Under the new structure, Naver Corporation (Line's former parent company) and SoftBank Corp. (the wireless carrier unit of SoftBank Group) each hold 50 percent stakes in a new company named A Holdings Corp., which holds a majority stake in Z Holdings, which will operate Line and Yahoo! Japan. Upon integrating the two businesses and creating further platforms, the merged company aims to compete with the U.S. tech giants Google, Amazon, Facebook, and Apple and the Chinese tech giants Baidu, Alibaba, and Tencent, as well as the Japanese e-commerce giant Rakuten. The merger also gives Z Holdings three additional Asian markets where Line is popular: Taiwan, Thailand, and Indonesia. 

Yahoo Japan's services are not available in the European Economic Area and the UK since 6 April 2022, due to "excessive regulatory burden".

Industry affiliations
Yahoo! Japan was a founding member of Rakuten, a Japanese e-business association led by CEO Hiroshi Mikitani, in February 2010; this occurred after Rakuten withdrew from the Japan Business Federation (Keidanren) in June 2011 and made moves to become the Japan Association of New Economy as a rival to Keidanren. Yahoo! Japan withdrew from the e-business association in March 2012 and it joined Keidanren in July 2012.

Design
Yahoo! Japan continues to use a site design from prior to 2007 and the international Yahoo logo used before 2013, colored red.

Search engine 
One of its primary businesses, originally the Yahoo! Japan search engine was a directorytype search engine, similar to Yahoo! in the United States. A crawlertype search engine was used as well, and as the popularity of the crawlertype search engine gradually increased, after October 3, 2005, Yahoo! Japan began utilizing only the crawlertype engine. On June 29, 2017, Yahoo! Japan announced that the directory-based search engine "Yahoo! Category", which had been in operation since its establishment, would be abolished on March 29, 2018.

As a crawlertype search engine, Yahoo! Japan initially used technology from the Japanese company Goo, which used Google's technology. The company later switched to using Yahoo Search Technology (YST), developed by Yahoo! in the US. In addition to serving as a standard search engine, Yahoo! Japan partnered with Twitter to provide real-time search for tweets. It also receives data feeds from partner companies; Cookpad and Naver information is displayed in search results.

"Yahoo! Search Custom Search" was discontinued on March 31, 2019.

Services
Yahoo! Japan currently offers various web-based services and apps for its customers, including the following:
 Ymobile: Ymobile Corporation (ワイモバイル株式会社), stylized Y!mobile, is a subsidiary of Japanese telecommunications company SoftBank Group Corporation that provides mobile telecommunications and ADSL services. The current CEO of the company is Ken Miyauchi. It was formed in 2014 through the merger of Willcom and eAccess, and uses the Y! moniker brand from Yahoo! Japan, which is partly-owned by SoftBank.
 Yahoo! Japan Mail: maintains the classic look of Yahoo! Mail, but remains a separate service operated in Japan. Another notable change is the 10 GB storage limit, in contrast to Yahoo! Mail's 1 TB of storage and its former unlimited-storage offering.
 Yahoo! Japan Auctions (ヤフオク！）: Japan's largest Internet auction service. Previously known as Yahoo! Auction and Yafuoku.
 Yahoo! Japan T-Point: A rewards program that allows users to earn and redeem points for goods or cash.
 Yahoo! Premium: A paid service allowing users to obtain certain benefits, including the ability to bid on certain auction listings, and various premium features with Yahoo! Wallet (which can be used in conjunction with Japan Net Bank, Mitsubishi UFJ Bank, and Rakuten Bank) and Yahoo! points.
 Yahoo! Japan GyaO: A video on-demand service that has included programs such as Calimero, Creamy Mami, the Magic Angel, Intrigue in the Bakumatsu – Irohanihoheto, Jormungand, Kyorochan, Musashi Gundoh, Nyanpire, PRODUCE 101 JAPAN, Real Drive, The World of Golden Eggs. Service terminate on March 2023.

Other Yahoo! Japan services include or have included Yahoo! Japan Bookstore, Yahoo! Japan News, Yahoo! Japan GeoCities (discontinued in March 2019),  Yahoo! Japan Toto (a sports lottery site), Yahoo! Shopping, Yahoo! Travel, Yahoo! Roko (a mapping and review service), Yahoo! Box (a cloud storage service), Yahoo! Mobage (a social networking service), Yahoo! Wisdom Bag (similar to Yahoo! Answers), and Yahoo! Browser (an androidbased web browser).

From April 6, 2022, the home page blocked users from the EEA and the UK, apparently due to General Data Protection Regulation. Some subsidiary services such as Yahoo! JAPAN Mail remained functional, although limited.

Gallery

See also 
 Yahoo! Japan Search Awards

References

External links

 Yahoo! Japan 
 Company info 

1996 establishments in Japan
1997 initial public offerings
2021 mergers and acquisitions
Companies listed on the Tokyo Stock Exchange
Internet technology companies of Japan
Internet properties established in 1996
Japanese brands
Japanese entertainment websites
Japanese-language websites
Liberal media in Japan
Mass media companies based in Tokyo
Naver Corporation
SoftBank Group
Telecommunications companies based in Tokyo
Video on demand services
Japan
Z Holdings